List of birds of Santa Cruz County, California. The county is in Northern California, located on the California coast, including northern Monterey Bay, and west of the San Francisco Bay and Silicon Valley. It includes the southwestern Santa Cruz Mountains.

Avian habitats include: coastal prairie, Northern coastal scrub, Maritime Ponderosa Pine forests, Coast redwood forests, Interior chaparral and woodlands, and mixed evergreen forests.

Included are: common (C), fairly common (F), and uncommon (U) sightings/occurrences. Not included are: rare, casual, and irregular sightings.

See also
List of birds of California

References

California, Santa Cruz
Birds Santa Cruz
Natural history of Santa Cruz County, California